The 2022 Vienna Vikings season is the inaugural season of the newly formed Vienna Vikings team in the second season of the European League of Football.

Preseason
After being introduced as one of the 2022 expansion teams, the Vikings announced on October 19, 2021 to continue with Chris Calaycay as a head coach. In November, the Vikings held their first ELF Combine on November 6, 2021 and there after signed the first player with Luis Horvath. The first notable acquisition is the signing of former Clemson Tigers wide receiver Diondre Overton. He then was drafted for the 2022 USFL season by the Philadelphia Stars (2022).

On February 12, 2022 the management of the Vienna Vikings announced that they will play all their home games of this season in one of the most modern stadiums of the league with the Generali Arena Vienna. Before the season, the team had a combined training camp and a friendly scrimmage with the Leipzig Kings.

Regular season

Standings

Schedule

Source: europeanleague.football

Roster

Transactions
From Hamburg Sea Devils: Adrià Botella Moreno (December 20, 2021)

Staff

Notes

References 

Vienna Vikings season
Vienna Vikings
Vienna Vikings